Eupoecilia cebrana is a species of moth of the family Tortricidae. It is found in Sweden, France, Germany, Denmark, Poland, Austria, Slovakia, Estonia, Latvia, Lithuania, Russia, North Macedonia and Greece.

The wingspan is 15–17 mm. Adults are on wing in May and from July to August.

The larvae feed on Helichrysum species, including Helichrysum arenarium.

References

Moths described in 1813
Eupoecilia